Seán Milroy (1877 – 30 November 1946) was an Irish revolutionary and politician, who took part in the 1916 Easter Rising and served in the Second Dáil during the War of Independence and afterwards in the Seanad of the Irish Free State.

Biography
Milroy was born in Maryport, Cumberland, England to Scottish parents. He moved to Cork as a young adult. He was a journalist by profession.

He was a close personal friend of Arthur Griffith and an early member of Sinn Féin, serving on its national executive from 1909 to 1912. He joined the Irish Volunteers, and in 1915 he was arrested and imprisoned for three months for a speech in which he urged Irishmen not to fight in World War I. He fought in the Easter Rising in 1916, and was imprisoned in England.

On 3 April 1918, Milroy contested a by-election for Sinn Féin in Tyrone East unsuccessfully. At the 1918 United Kingdom general election he stood in Tyrone North-East, but an electoral pact brokered by Cardinal Michael Logue allocated the seat to the Irish Parliamentary Party and it was not contested by Sinn Féin. He was elected a Sinn Féin Teachta Dála (TD) at the 1921 elections for both the Cavan constituency and for the Fermanagh and Tyrone constituency. He supported the Anglo-Irish Treaty and voted in favour of it.

He became a member of Cumann na nGaedheal but left the party and resigned from his seat on 30 October 1924 along with seven other TDs in opposition to the Government's actions to the so-called Irish Army Mutiny. He contested the June 1927 general election unsuccessfully.

In later years, he made up with his former colleagues and was elected to Seanad Éireann, serving for both Cumann na nGaedheal and later for Fine Gael from 1928 until the Free State Seanad was abolished in 1936. He was re-elected to the new Seanad in 1938, following the 1937 general election but failed to be re-elected following the 1938 general election.

References

Sources
Todd Andrews (1979), Dublin Made Me.
Tim Pat Coogan (1995), De Valera: Long Fellow, Long Shadow.
Memoirs of Senator Joseph Connolly: A Founder of Modern Ireland. J. Anthony Gaughan (ed), 1996.

1877 births
1946 deaths
Early Sinn Féin TDs
Cumann na nGaedheal TDs
Cumann na nGaedheal senators
People of the Easter Rising
Fine Gael senators
Irish anti–World War I activists
Irish people of Scottish descent
Members of the Irish Republican Brotherhood
Members of the 2nd Dáil
Members of the 3rd Dáil
Members of the 4th Dáil
Members of the 1928 Seanad
Members of the 1931 Seanad
Members of the 1934 Seanad
Members of the 2nd Seanad
Members of the House of Commons of Northern Ireland 1921–1925
Members of the House of Commons of Northern Ireland for Fermanagh and Tyrone
People from Maryport
People of the Irish Civil War (Pro-Treaty side)
Sinn Féin parliamentary candidates
Irish Republican Army (1919–1922) members